Albert Henrik Lilius (7 December 1873, in Hamina – 31 October 1947, in Helsinki) was a child psychologist a pioneering researcher in Finland and professor at the University of Helsinki. He published a book about Nordic figures from the history of educational work along with several others.

References

1873 births
1947 deaths
Finnish psychologists
Academic staff of the University of Helsinki